The Factory Incident was an American post-punk band from Washington, D.C. Formed in 2000, they released two EPs on the Washington, D.C.-based label Postfact Records.

History
After Government Issue disbanded, John Stabb fronted a number of bands and eventually collaborated with guitarists Karl Hill and Aimee Soubier, bassist Shaun Wright, and drummer Stephen Brown. The band released their EP, Helmshore, in the fall of 2001, a 7-inch for the song "Rail" and a full-length entitled Redtape  before disbanding in late 2005. In late-2013, John Stabb reformed Government Issue with a permanent line-up and recruited Karl Hill to play drums.

Band members
John Stabb (Vocals)
Karl Hill (Guitar)
Aimee Soubier (Guitar)
Shaun Wright (Bass)
Stephen Brown (Drums)

Discography

References

External links
"Interview: John Stabb of Government Issue". Scissor Press/Verbicide 2008. Retrieved 2016-03-07.
"Interview with The Factory Incident". Ear Candy Magazine 2003. Retrieved 2016-03-07.
The Factory Incident Discography at Discogs. Retrieved 2016-03-09
The Factory Incident - BandToBand.com. Retrieved 2016-03-07.

American post-hardcore musical groups
Musical groups from Washington, D.C.
Rock music groups from Washington, D.C.
Alternative rock groups from Washington, D.C.
Musical groups established in 2000